Patriarch John XIV may refer to:

 John XIV of Constantinople, Patriarch of Constantinople in 1334–1347
 Pope John XIV of Alexandria, Pope of Alexandria & Patriarch of the See of St. Mark in 1571–1586